Viorica Viscopoleanu (née Belmega on 8 August 1939) is a retired Romanian long jumper athlete. She competed at the 1964, 1968 and 1972 Olympics and won a gold medal in 1968, setting a new world record. At the European championships she won a silver medal outdoors in 1969 and two medals indoors, in 1970 and 1971. After retiring from competitions she worked as a coach at her club Steaua București. Monica Iagăr was one of her trainees.

References

External links

 

1939 births
Living people
Romanian female long jumpers
Olympic athletes of Romania
Athletes (track and field) at the 1964 Summer Olympics
Athletes (track and field) at the 1968 Summer Olympics
Athletes (track and field) at the 1972 Summer Olympics
Olympic gold medalists for Romania
World record setters in athletics (track and field)
European Athletics Championships medalists
People from Chernivtsi Oblast
Medalists at the 1968 Summer Olympics
Olympic gold medalists in athletics (track and field)
Universiade medalists in athletics (track and field)
Universiade silver medalists for Romania
Medalists at the 1965 Summer Universiade